The Municipality of Sveti Jurij v Slovenskih Goricah is a municipality in northeastern Slovenia. It was created in 2006 when it separated from the Municipality of Lenart. It lies at the western end of the Slovene Hills. Its administrative centre is in Jurovski Dol. The area is part of the traditional region of Styria. It is now included in the Drava Statistical Region.

The municipality gets its name from the local parish church in Jurovski Dol, dedicated to Saint George.

Settlements
In addition to the municipal seat of Jurovski Dol, the municipality also includes the following settlements:
 Malna
 Spodnji Gasteraj
 Srednji Gasteraj
 Varda
 Zgornje Partinje
 Zgornji Gasteraj
 Žitence

References

External links

Sveti Jurij v Slovenskih Goricah municipal site
Sveti Jurij v Slovenskih Goricah on Geopedia

 
Sveti Jurij V Slovenskih Goricah
Sveti Jurij v Slovenskih Goricah
2006 establishments in Slovenia